Robert Whitehill (July 21, 1738 – April 8, 1813) was a member of the U.S. House of Representatives from Pennsylvania.

Robert Whitehill (brother of John Whitehill, uncle of James Whitehill, and great-great-grandfather of John Crain Kunkel) was born in Pequea, Pennsylvania.  He settled in Cumberland County, Pennsylvania. He was a member of the Pennsylvania State Constitutional Convention in July 1776 that approved the Declaration of Independence. He was a member of the council of safety in 1777, and a delegate to the State constitutional convention in 1790. He served as a member of the Pennsylvania House of Representatives from 1797 to 1800.

He served in the Pennsylvania State Senate from 1801 to 1804 and was speaker of the Senate in 1804 during the impeachment trials of the judges of the Supreme Court of Pennsylvania.

Whitehill was elected to the Ninth Congress to fill the vacancy caused by the death of John A. Hanna. He was reelected to the Tenth and to the three succeeding Congresses and served until his death at Lauther Manor, Cumberland County, Pennsylvania. He was interred in Silver Spring Presbyterian Church Cemetery in Hampden Township, near Camp Hill, Pennsylvania.

Notable writings include the Pennsylvania Constitution of 1776, which he helped draft, and the Minority Dissent to the ratification of the US Constitution by Pennsylvania. This dissent included a number of proposed amendments to the US Constitution and is thought to have been used by James Madison when he drafted the United States Bill of Rights.

See also
List of United States Congress members who died in office (1790–1899)

Sources

The Political Graveyard
 Crist, Robert Grant. Robert Whitehill and the Struggle for Civil Rights: A Paper Presented Before the Hamilton Library and Historical Association of Cumberland County, Carlisle, Pennsylvania., on March 20, 1958. Lemoyne, Pennsylvania.: Lemoyne Trust Co., 1958.
 Crist, Robert G. ed., Pennsylvania and the Bill of Rights (University Park:Pennsylvania Historical Association, 1990).
Pittman, R. Carter, "Jasper Yeates’s Notes on the Pennsylvania Ratifying Convention, 1787," William and Mary Quarterly, 3rd Ser. (22, 2 April 1965): 301–318.
Explore PA History

1738 births
1813 deaths
American Presbyterians
Members of the Pennsylvania House of Representatives
Pennsylvania state senators
Politicians from Lancaster, Pennsylvania
People from Cumberland County, Pennsylvania
People of colonial Pennsylvania
Democratic-Republican Party members of the United States House of Representatives from Pennsylvania